Darya Sergeyevna Pikalova (Stukalova; born 22 August 1994) is a Russian Paralympic swimmer. Her husband Alexander Pikalov is also a paralympic swimmer.

Career 
She won a silver medal and three bronze medals on her debut Paralympic appearance representing Russia at the 2012 Summer Paralympics. She won five gold medals and a silver medal at the 2013 IPC Swimming World Championships in Montreal.

She also represented Russian Paralympic Committee athletes at the 2020 Summer Paralympics and claimed bronze medal in the women's butterfly S13 event at the 2020 Summer Paralympics.

References

1994 births
Living people
S12-classified Paralympic swimmers
Paralympic swimmers of Russia
Paralympic gold medalists for Russia
Paralympic silver medalists for Russia
Paralympic bronze medalists for Russia
Paralympic medalists in swimming
Paralympic gold medalists for the Russian Paralympic Committee athletes
Paralympic silver medalists for the Russian Paralympic Committee athletes
Paralympic bronze medalists for the Russian Paralympic Committee athletes
Swimmers at the 2012 Summer Paralympics
Swimmers at the 2020 Summer Paralympics
Medalists at the 2012 Summer Paralympics
Medalists at the 2020 Summer Paralympics
Medalists at the World Para Swimming Championships
Medalists at the World Para Swimming European Championships
Russian female freestyle swimmers
Russian female backstroke swimmers
Russian female butterfly swimmers
Russian female medley swimmers
20th-century Russian women
21st-century Russian women